The Men I Love is a tribute album by Amii Stewart released in 1995, a follow-up to 1994's Lady To Ladies. On this album Stewart pays tribute to her favourite male singers, among them Paul McCartney, Sting, Stevie Wonder, and Elton John.

Track listing
"The Long and Winding Road" - 4:35
"Boogie Down" - 4:15
"Every Breath You Take" - 3:36
"Me and Mrs. Jones (Me and Mr. Jones)" - 4:30
"I Just Wanna Stop" - 4:30
"Sailing" - 4:10
"September Morn" - 4:00
"Overjoyed" - 4:55
"Fire and Rain" - 4:14
"Turn Your Love Around" - 3:42
"Your Song" - 4:15
"Princess Dream [theme from La Figlia del Marajah]" - 3:12

Personnel
 Lead vocals/main performer - Amii Stewart
 Bass - Riccardo Fioravanti
 Drums - Gabriele Melotti
 Guitar - Danilo Minotti, Giorgio Cocilovo
 Keyboards - Gaetano Leandro
 Orchestra - Camerata Musicale
 Percussion - Naco
 Piano - Carlo Gargioni
 Saxophone, Flute - Claudio Allifranchini, Massimo Zagonari, Roger Rota
 Trombone - Giovanni Di Stefano, Luigi Avellino
 Trumpet - Davide Ghidoni, Emilio Soana
 Cello - Fabrizio Fabiano, Marilena Pennati, Marto Decimo, Roberto Politi
 Viola - Anna Rolando, Emilio Eria, Paola Guerri, Ugo Martelli
 Backing vocals - Agnese Bravo, Anna Paola Francia, Bruno Rondinella, Edoardo de Angelis, Elena Picco, Luca Campioni, Marco Campioni, Luca Di Gioia, Margherita Graczyc, Mauro Rossi, Paola Folli, Rossella Pirotta

Production
 Mario Natale - producer

References

Amii Stewart albums
1995 compilation albums
Tribute albums